B.N.N. College is a college in Bhiwandi in Thane district in Maharashtra state in India. It is affiliated to University of Mumbai. The college was established in 1966 and offers undergraduate degrees in arts, commerce, and science and graduation as well in all these streams. The full name of the college is Padmashri Annasaheb Jadhav Bhiwandi Nizampur Nagar College, but it is more commonly referred to as B.N.N. College. Dr. Ashok Wagh has been the principal of B.N.N College since 1992. The college also offers an official app on the Google Play Store where students can view the courses offered, get career counseling and guidance, view images of campus events, and find directions for getting to the campus.

The subjects offered in Jr. College Arts are English, EVS, Marathi, Hindi, Urdu, History, Geography, Political Science, Philosophy, Psychology, Economics & Health, and Physical Education. The subjects offered for Science Stream are English, EVS, Marathi, Hindi, Urdu, Physics, Chemistry, Biology, Mathematics & Geography. The subjects offered for Commerce Stream are English, EVS, Marathi, Hindi, Urdu, Economics, Book Keeping, Secretarial Practice, Organization of Commerce, Mathematics & Health, and Physical Education.

B.N.N college also offers post-graduation programs in Management studies, Science, Commerce & Arts. B.N.N. college also offers Professional courses in graduation such as BSC.IT, BSC.CS(Computer Science),BAF, BBI, BMS, BMM, BBA, BCOM (Hons) in Accounting.

B.N.N. college also offers MBA courses in Finance, Marketing and Human resources management.

The college has been a witness to the cultural, social, political, communal, and educational development of Bhiwandi city. B.N.N. College completes 50 years in the 2015–16 academic year and celebrated its Golden Jubilee Year. The college celebrates every year Annual & Cultural festivals.

In 2017, BNN college students organized Techno Fest. It is also celebrated as an annual fest. In Techno Fest they conducted the technical events and cultural events.

B.N.N college also provides training for NCC, NSS, IQAC, and NAAC.

B.N.N. college located at Varaladevi Road, Dhamankar Naka, Bhiwandi, Dist-Thane, Maharashtra - 421305

References

5.https://maharashtratimes.indiatimes.com/maharashtra/thane-kokan-news/thane/award-to-bnn-college-in-bhiwandi/articleshow/73773614.cms

Colleges in India
Universities and colleges in Maharashtra
Education in Bhiwandi
Educational institutions established in 1966
1966 establishments in Maharashtra